Restore and Build Kenya (RBK) is a Kenyan political party launched in April 2012 by former Permanent Secretary Professor James ole Kiyiapi as part of his campaign to become the fourth  President of Kenya.

References 

Political parties in Kenya
Political parties established in 2012
2012 establishments in Kenya